Rob Hoskins (born May 18, 1965) is a global development leader and president of OneHope. 

Rob has overseen startups, spearheaded sustainable local & global transformation initiatives, and advised NGOs and higher education institutions. He also consults for corporations to help revitalize their mission and vision, then scale for growth.

Biography

Early life 

Born to missionary parents  Bob and Hazel Hoskins, Hoskins was born in Bangor, Maine and has lived in Lebanon, France, California and Florida.  He attended the American International School for his primary education in Lebanon, International Lycee for junior high school in France and Westminster Academy for senior high school in Ft. Lauderdale, Florida.

Career 
According to OneHope under Hoskins’ leadership they have worked in over 179 countries and translated their programs into over 100 languages. Rob may be best known for open-handedly sharing research--he has launched multiple global research studies to forecast trends then spearheaded massive partnerships and initiatives such as Bible App for Kids with YouVersion, Lead Today with John Maxwell and EQUIP, and Vision 2030 that mobilizes local churches to reach every child in every nation on the planet with God’s Word by 20300--and best practices, namely his highly successful measurement system of incorporating outcome-based methods.

Since 2004, Rob has been President of OneHope, Inc. which has helped reach more than 1.7 billion children with a life-changing message of hope. Rob has served with numerous networks in various leadership capacities including the Forum of Bible Agencies International (FOBAI), Chair of the Strategy Working Group with the Lausanne Movement, and Chair of the Board at Oral Roberts University (ORU). Rob presently serves as the Senior Advisor to the World Evangelical Alliance (WEA). Hoskins is an ordained general-appointed missionary of the Assemblies of God Church.

Research 

In 2007, Hoskins was instrumental in launching a 44-country research initiative named Spiritual State of the World’s Children, so that OneHope could learn more about the unique needs, experiences and social traditions of children and youth around the world,  including the United States.

Over the course of 4 years, more than 152,000 13- to 19-year-olds on 5 continents  answered questions about their life.  The research was collected by the Metadigm Group. 

Hoskins decided to make the research available for free so that other organizations may benefit from its findings.

Publications 

Maxwell, John C. and Hoskins, Rob (2021). Change Your World: How Anyone, Anywhere Can Make a Difference. Harper Collins Leadership. 

Hoskins, Rob (2014). MissioLOGICAL: Thoughts on missions, leadership and reaching the next generation. 

Hoskins, Rob (2012). Hope Delivered: Affecting destiny through the power of God’s Word. Passio. 

Hoskins, Rob (2002). Then…Seeds of Spiritual Lineage. Book of Hope.

References

External links 

Metadigm 	
Elite Research

1965 births
Living people
Vanguard University alumni
American evangelicals
American Pentecostal missionaries
People from Bangor, Maine